The Pickwick Papers is a twelve-part BBC adaptation of the 1837 novel The Pickwick Papers by Charles Dickens, first broadcast in 1985. It starred Nigel Stock, Alan Parnaby, Clive Swift and Patrick Malahide, with narration by Ray Brooks.

Central characters 
Nigel Stock as Samuel Pickwick – the protagonist and founder of the Pickwick Club.
Jeremy Nicholas as Mr. Nathaniel Winkle – travelling companion and friend of Pickwick's; a reluctant sportsman                                 
Alan Parnaby as Mr. Augustus Snodgrass – another companion and friend; an amiable poet.
Clive Swift as Mr. Tracy Tupman – another friend; a very flirtatious man
Phil Daniels as Sam Weller – Mr. Pickwick's valet
Howard Lang as Tony Weller – Sam's father; does not really know if his name is written as Veller or Weller      
Patrick Malahide as Mr. Alfred Jingle – a strolling player, and a charlatan
Colin Douglas as Mr. Wardle – friend of Pickwick's, a widower with two daughters
Milton Johns as Mr. Perker – Pickwick's lawyer
Pip Donaghy as Job Trotter – Jingle's servant
Jo Kendall as Mrs. Bardell – Pickwick's landlady

Other characters 

Dione Inman – Isabella Wardle
Valerie Whittington – Emily Wardle
Ned Williams – Master Bardell
David Nunn – Joe (Fat Boy)
Patience Collier – Old Mrs. Wardle
Freda Dowie – Rachel Wardle
Hugh Ross – Jackson
Tamsin Heatley – Mary
Sarah Finch – Arabella Allen
Shirley Cain – Miss Witherfield
Dallas Cavell – Roker
Gerald James – Dr. Slammer
John Patrick – Lt. Tappleton
Russell Denton – Waiter – Bull Inn
Anthony Roye – Dodson
Kenneth Waller – Fogg
Alan Mason – Dying prisoner
Paddy Ward – Wardle Manservant
John Woodnutt – Sergeant Snubbin
Michael Ripper – Phunkey
Nicholas Jeune – Trundle
June Ellis – Cook
Richard Henry – Lowten
David Beckett – Benjamin Allen
Deddie Davies – Mrs. Cluppins
Stephen Finlay – Bob Sawyer
George Little – Peter Magnus
James Cossins – Nupkins

References

External links 

BBC television dramas
Films based on The Pickwick Papers
Television shows based on works by Charles Dickens
1980s British television miniseries
1985 British television series debuts
1985 British television series endings
Television series set in the 1830s